Bill, Willie or William Logan may refer to:

Politicians and activists 
William Logan (Kentuckian) (1776–1822), U.S. Senator from Kentucky
William Logan (temperance campaigner) (1813–1879), Scottish missionary and temperance activist
William F. Logan (fl. 1860s), see List of mayors of Williamsport, Pennsylvania
William Turner Logan (1874–1941), U.S. Representative from South Carolina
William Logan Martin (1883–1959), Alabama judge and Attorney General
Bill Logan (spartacist) (fl. 1970s), New Zealand Spartacist and member of the International Communist League
William J. Logan (Orangeman) (fl. 1990s), Sovereign Grand Master of the Northern Irish Royal Black Preceptory
Willie Logan (born 1957), American politician from Florida
William Logan (Indian agent), Indian agent in Oregon and appointed superintendent of The Dalles Mint for the United States

Artists and writers 
William Logan (author) (1841–1914), Scottish author of Malabar Manual
William Logan (poet) (born 1950), U.S. poet and critic

Sportspersons 
William Logan (cricketer) (fl. 1880s), Australian cricketer
William Logan (footballer), Scottish footballer
William Francis Logan (Bill Logan, born 1905), soccer, basketball and Lacrosse coach of Princeton Tigers men's basketball 
William Logan (speed skater) (1907–1955), Canadian Olympic speed skater
William Logan (cyclist) (1914–2002), American cyclist
Bill Logan (basketball), 1950s American basketball player, member of Iowa Hawkeyes' Fabulous Five

Other 
Willie Logan (Loganair) (1913–1966), Scottish construction contractor, founder of Loganair
William Edmond Logan (1798–1875), Canadian geologist
Bill Logan (Action Comics 513), a DC Comics character